CAR-302,668 (302668, α-isopropylmandelic acid (1-methyl-1,2,3,6-tetrahydro-4-pyridyl)methyl ester) is an anticholinergic deliriant drug, invented under contract to Edgewood Arsenal in the 1960s. It is a reasonably potent incapacitating agent with an ED50 of 4μg/kg and a long duration of action of around 16-24 hours.

See also 
 CAR-302,282
 EA-3834

References 

Deliriants
Muscarinic antagonists
Incapacitating agents
Carboxylate esters
Tertiary alcohols